Bang Bamru station is a railway station located at Bang Phlat Subdistrict, Bang Phlat District, Bangkok. It is a class 1 station and serves two systems operated by the State Railway of Thailand, Southern Line and the SRT Light Red Line.

History
Bang Bamru railway station originally opened as a single wooden building with concrete platforms with a junction for a rail line to Northern Phra Nakhon Power Station at Bang Kruai for Lignite Coal trains from the Mae Mo Mines, Lampang. It was rebuilt to form a larger station with a concrete structure. And again in September 2009 to the current modern, concrete building with platforms also for the SRT Light Red Line project.

Station layout

Services

Light Red Line

Southern Line
As of 6 January 2022, 16 trains serve Bang Bamru railway station (excluding services on the Light Red Line).

Outbound

Inbound

Bus services
The following BMTA routes serve this station: 
 79 (Borommaratchachonnani Depot – Southern Bus Terminal (Pinklao))
 208 (Taling Chan – Arun Amarin) (Loop)
 515 (CentralPlaza Salaya – Victory Monument)
 539 (Om Noi – Victory Monument)

Gallery

References

Railway stations in Thailand